Thomas Scott Campbell (born February 14, 1959) is an American politician, farmer, and entrepreneur. He served as a Republican member of the North Dakota Senate from 2012 to 2018.

Career 
He was first elected in 2012 and was reelected in 2014. He co-founded Campbell Farms in Grafton, North Dakota with his brothers in 1978, and the company has since expanded to multiple locations.

2018 United States Senate election 

In August 2017, Campbell announced his candidacy for the Republican nomination for the United States Senate seat then held by Democrat Heidi Heitkamp. Campbell withdrew from the race following the entry of fellow Republican Kevin Cramer into the race, endorsing his campaign.

2018 congressional election 

In February 2018, Campbell declared his candidacy for the congressional seat to be vacated by Cramer.

Campbell did not receive the endorsement of the North Dakota Republican Party at the state party convention in April 2018, losing to fellow state Senator, Kelly Armstrong. Following his defeat at the convention, Campbell announced his intention to continue his campaign to the primary election in June 2018. On April 11, 2018, Campbell withdrew his candidacy from the primary race.

Electoral history

References

1959 births
21st-century American politicians
Businesspeople from North Dakota
Candidates in the 2018 United States Senate elections
Farmers from North Dakota
Living people
Democratic Party North Dakota state senators
North Dakota State University alumni
People from Walsh County, North Dakota